Marion County Airport  is a county-owned, public-use airport in Marion County, Georgia, United States. It is located three nautical miles (6 km) southeast of the central business district of Buena Vista, Georgia.

Facilities and aircraft 
Marion County Airport covers an area of 206 acres (83 ha) at an elevation of 682 feet (208 m) above mean sea level. It has one runway designated 14/32 with an asphalt surface measuring 3,200 by 75 feet (975 x 23 m).

For the 12-month period ending June 12, 2011, the airport had 1,200 general aviation aircraft operations, an average of 100 per month.

References

External links 
 Marion County Airport (82A) at Georgia DOT Airport Directory
 Aerial image as of January 1999 from USGS The National Map
 

Airports in Georgia (U.S. state)
Transportation in Marion County, Georgia